Are Weierholt Strandli (born 18 August 1988, in Stavanger) is a Norwegian rower. He competed at the 2012 Summer Olympics in London, finishing ninth in the lightweight double sculls with Kristoffer Brun, and won a bronze medal in the same event at the 2016 Summer Olympics.

References

External links
 
 
 
 

Norwegian male rowers
1988 births
Living people
Sportspeople from Stavanger
Rowers at the 2012 Summer Olympics
Rowers at the 2016 Summer Olympics
Olympic rowers of Norway
World Rowing Championships medalists for Norway
Olympic bronze medalists for Norway
Olympic medalists in rowing
Medalists at the 2016 Summer Olympics
European Rowing Championships medalists
Rowers at the 2020 Summer Olympics